Ponsard-Ansaloni was the brand name of a power pack conversion manufactured in France only in 1898.  The contraption, which had a twin-cylinder Roser-Mazurier engine, was meant to convert horse-drawn carriages into automobiles.  It was also marketed under the name "Brulé".

References
David Burgess Wise, The New Illustrated Encyclopedia of Automobiles.

Defunct motor vehicle manufacturers of France